Huangmaoping Station is a station on International Expo branch of Line 6 of Chongqing Rail Transit in Chongqing municipality, China, which opened as an infill station in 2015. It is located in Yubei District.

References

Railway stations in Chongqing
Railway stations in China opened in 2015
Chongqing Rail Transit stations